The Topeka Boulevard Bridge is a four-lane automobile and pedestrian crossing of the Kansas River at Topeka, Kansas, U.S.A.  A complete rebuilding of the bridge took place from 2006 to 2008, in which guarded walkways for pedestrians were added, as well as various aesthetic amenities, like a clock.  The bridge spans the Kansas River from West 1st Avenue to NW Gordon Street.

Bridges over the Kansas River
Road bridges in Kansas